Örenyaka is a village in the Keban District of Elazığ Province in Turkey. The village is populated by Kurds of the Zirkan tribe and had a population of 23 in 2021.

References

Villages in Keban District
Kurdish settlements in Elazığ Province